The following lists events that happened during 2011 in Australia.

Incumbents

Monarch – Elizabeth II
Governor-General – Quentin Bryce
Prime Minister – Julia Gillard
Deputy Prime Minister – Wayne Swan
Opposition Leader – Tony Abbott
Chief Justice – Robert French

State and Territory Leaders
Premier of New South Wales – Kristina Keneally (until 28 March), then Barry O'Farrell
Opposition Leader – Barry O'Farrell (until 28 March), then John Robertson
Premier of Queensland – Anna Bligh
Opposition Leader – John-Paul Langbroek (until 11 April), then Jeff Seeney
Premier of South Australia – Mike Rann (until 21 October), then Jay Weatherill
Opposition Leader – Isobel Redmond
Premier of Tasmania – David Bartlett (until 23 January), then Lara Giddings
Opposition Leader – Will Hodgman
Premier of Victoria – Ted Baillieu
Opposition Leader – Daniel Andrews
Premier of Western Australia – Colin Barnett
Opposition Leader – Eric Ripper
Chief Minister of the Australian Capital Territory – Jon Stanhope (until 12 May), then Katy Gallagher
Opposition Leader – Zed Seselja
Chief Minister of the Northern Territory – Paul Henderson
Opposition Leader – Terry Mills
Chief Minister of Norfolk Island – David Buffett

Governors and Administrators
Governor of New South Wales – Marie Bashir
Governor of Queensland –  Penelope Wensley
Governor of South Australia – Kevin Scarce
Governor of Tasmania – Peter Underwood
Governor of Victoria – David de Kretser (until 7 April), then Alex Chernov
Governor of Western Australia – Ken Michael (until 2 May), then Malcolm McCusker
Administrator of the Australian Indian Ocean Territories – Brian Lacy
Administrator of Norfolk Island – Owen Walsh
Administrator of the Northern Territory – Tom Pauling (until 31 October), then Sally Thomas

Events

January

 December 2010 to January 2011 – Flooding across Queensland continues, the most widespread flooding disaster in Queensland history. The Toowoomba and Lockyer Valley regions are severely affected by floodwaters on 10 January, which would later lead to flooding in the Ipswich and Brisbane regions.
 10 January – A large bushfire threatens the area of Lake Clifton, Western Australia, about 100 km south of Perth.
 13 January –  of rain falls in 24 hours at Scamander in north east Tasmania leads to flash flooding in the town, along with St Helens.
 14 January – Major floods occur across much of western and central Victoria totally inundating the town of Carisbrook and causing evacuations in many others.
 17 January – The Commission of Inquiry into the 2010–11 Queensland floods is established to investigate matters related to the Queensland floods.
 23 January  – Corporal Ben Roberts-Smith of the Special Air Service Regiment is awarded the Victoria Cross for Australia for his actions in the Shah Wali Kot Offensive in June 2010, part of the War in Afghanistan.
 23 January – David Bartlett announces his resignation as Premier of Tasmania citing a desire to spend more time with his family.
 27 January – Prime Minister Julia Gillard announces that her government proposes to introduce a Flood levy to assist in funding reconstruction works required as a result of major floods in Queensland and Victoria.

February

3 February – Severe Tropical Cyclone Yasi makes landfall at near Mission Beach, south of Innisfail, Queensland.
4–5 February – Severe thunderstorms related to Tropical Cyclone Anthony affect much of Victoria. Flash flooding affected many places across the state including Mildura in the state's north west and the south eastern suburbs of Melbourne.
6–7 February – Bushfires in Perth destroy at least 50 houses.
17 February – REDGroup Retail (including the Borders and Angus & Robertson bookshop chains) is placed into voluntary administration with Ferrier Hodgson appointed as administrators.
24 February – Prime Minister Julia Gillard announced that the Federal Government proposed to introduce a carbon pricing scheme by 1 July 2012. Federal Opposition Leader Tony Abbott claims that Gillard broke a promise made during the 2010 Federal election campaign not to introduce a carbon tax.
24 February – AFACT loses its appeal to the Federal Court of Australia affirming that iiNet was not liable for the illegal downloading and peer-to-peer file sharing of films and television programs by its users.

March
3 March – The temperature in Perth reaches above 30 degrees for the 26th consecutive day, making it the longest recorded heatwave in the city, beating the previous record set in 1988.
26 March – A state election is held in New South Wales. Kristina Keneally's Labor government is defeated by Barry O'Farrell's Liberal-National Coalition.

April
19 April – Floodwaters inundate around 100 houses in the western Queensland town of Roma.
20 April – Asylum seekers at Sydney's Villawood Detention Centre riot in protest over delays in processing their applications for asylum, burning down at least three buildings.

May
4 May – Virgin Blue Airlines is renamed and rebranded as Virgin Australia.
16 May – The Australian Capital Territory Legislative Assembly elects Katy Gallagher as Chief Minister, following the resignation of Jon Stanhope on 12 May.
29 May 2011: Detective Senior Constable Damien Leeding (CIB) was shot when he confronted an armed offender at the Pacific Pines Tavern on the Gold Coast. Leeding died in hospital on 1 June three days after being shot.

June
5 June – Say Yes demonstrations occur in numerous cities across Australia in support of political action on climate change.
11 June – Hundreds of flights are suspended following the ash cloud from an eruption in the Puyehue-Cordón Caulle volcano complex in Chile reaching southern Australia.
16 June – A report by the Victorian Ombudsman criticises the Chief Commissioner of Victoria Police Simon Overland's publication of "misleading" crime statistics in the lead-up to the 2010 State election. Overland subsequently resigns as Chief Commissioner.

July
25 July – The Gillard Government signs off on an arrangement with Malaysia that will see Australia deport 800 asylum seekers to that country in return for resettling 4000 refugees verified by the United Nations High Commissioner for Refugees.

August
8 August – A High Court judge orders the government's "Malaysia Solution" to send asylum seekers to Malaysia be put on hold until the full bench of the High Court could assess the scheme's legality.
9 August – The 2011 Census of Population and Housing is held.
28 August – Queensland Police confirm that bones found in bushland on the Sunshine Coast are those of missing teenager Daniel Morcombe. Morcombe had been missing since 2003
 31 August – The High Court of Australia rules the Gillard Government's "Malaysia Solution" for the processing of asylum-seekers is unlawful.

September
1 September – Forensic experts confirm that the remains of a person found on the grounds of the former HM Prison Pentridge are those of bushranger Ned Kelly.

October
19 to 29 October – Queen Elizabeth and Prince Philip visit Canberra, Perth, Brisbane and Melbourne.
21 October – Mike Rann stands down as Premier of South Australia after losing party support, and is replaced by Jay Weatherill.
21 October – Victoria Police officers forcibly remove Occupy Melbourne protesters from Melbourne's City Square.
28 to 30 October – the Commonwealth Heads of Government Meeting is held in Perth.
29 October – In response to industrial action by pilots, ground staff and engineers, Qantas grounds its entire international and domestic fleet.
31 October – Fair Work Australia orders the termination of all industrial action taken by Qantas and the involved trade unions. Qantas flights resume on the afternoon of that day.

November 
16 November – The President of the United States Barack Obama visits Australia to commemorate the 60th anniversary of the ANZUS alliance.
24 November – Harry Jenkins resigns as Speaker of the House of Representatives. Peter Slipper is elected in his place.
25 November – 34 homes are destroyed in Margaret River, Western Australia when a prescribed burn by the Department of Environment and Conservation had "gone wrong" and "escaped" into bushland.
 30 November – Legislative Assembly of Queensland passed a bill allowing civil partnerships for same-sex couples in Queensland; a similar legislation already exists in Tasmania, Victoria, the ACT and NSW.

December
 18 December – A boat sailing from Indonesia carrying over 200 asylum seekers sinks off the coast of Java while heading for Christmas Island. At least 160 people are feared dead.

Arts and literature

27 April – Andrew Ruhemann and Shaun Tan are awarded the Academy Award for Best Animated Short Film at the 83rd Academy Awards for their film The Lost Thing.
15 April – Ben Quilty is awarded the Archibald Prize for his portrait of Margaret Olley. The Wynne Prize was awarded to Richard Goodwin for Co-isolated slave and the Sulman Prize was awarded to Peter Smeeth for The artist's fate.
17 August – The National Gallery of Victoria announces it has acquired Madonna and Child with the infant Saint John the Baptist by Italian High Renaissance painter Antonio da Correggio. Purchased at auction for £3.2 million ($5.2 million), it is the most expensive acquisition in the 150-year history of the NGV.

Science and technology
15 September – Researchers from Monash University announce the identification of a new dolphin species, the Burrunan dolphin (Tursiops australis), in Victoria's Port Phillip and Gippsland Lakes.
4 October – American-born astrophysicist Brian Schmidt was awarded the 2011 Nobel Prize for Physics for his discovery of the increasing acceleration of the expansion of the universe. A professor at the Australian National University, Schmidt shared the award with Adam Riess and Saul Perlmutter.

Sport
7 January – Cricket: England wins The Ashes series 3–1 over Australia.
29 January – Tennis: Kim Clijsters wins the women's singles title at the 2011 Australian Open, defeating Li Na.
29 January – Soccer: Australia is defeated 1–0 in extra time by Japan in the final of the 2011 AFC Asian Cup in Qatar.
30 January – Tennis: Novak Djokovic wins the men's singles title at the 2011 Australian Open, defeating Andy Murray.
7 February – Cricket: Shane Watson wins the Allan Border Medal for the second year in a row.
12 February – Rugby League: The 2011 All Stars match is held at Skilled Park, with the NRL All Stars defeating the Indigenous All Stars 28–12. NRL fullback Josh Dugan of the Canberra Raiders wins the Preston Campbell award for Man of the Match. Preceding the game was the inaugural Women's All Stars match, which the NRL team also won 22–6.
27 February – Rugby League: 2010 NRL premiers the St. George Illawarra Dragons defeat Super League XV champions the Wigan Warriors 21–15 in the 2011 World Club Challenge, held in Wigan.
1 March – Soccer: North Queensland Fury are dropped from the A-League, after being unable to meet the financial requirements of Football Federation Australia.
13 March – Basketball: Bulleen Boomers defeat Canberra Capitals 103–78 to win the 2010–11 Women's National Basketball League championship.
13 March – Soccer: Brisbane Roar FC defeat Central Coast Mariners FC 4–2 on penalties (2–2 after extra time) to win the 2010–11 A-League Championship. Brisbane win the Premiership/Championship double.
21 March – Cricket: Tasmania win their second Sheffield Shield, beating New South Wales by seven wickets at Bellerive Oval.
27 March – Motor racing: German driver Sebastian Vettel win the 2011 Australian Grand Prix for Red Bull Racing, finishing 22 seconds ahead of British driver Lewis Hamilton.
29 April –  Basketball: New Zealand Breakers defeat Cairns Taipans 71–53 in the deciding game of the 2010–11 NBL Grand Final series. The Breakers become the first New Zealand team to win an NBL championship.
22 May – Netball: The Queensland Firebirds win the 2011 ANZ Championship defeating the Northern Mystics 57–44 in the Grand Final at Brisbane.
6 July – Rugby league: Queensland win a record sixth consecutive Rugby League State of Origin title, defeating New South Wales 34–24 in front of 52,498 fans at Lang Park to win the series by two matches to one.
9 July – Rugby union: Queensland win the 2011 Super Rugby championship, defeating the Christchurch-based Crusaders 18–13 in front of 52,116 fans at Lang Park; a record crowd for Australian provincial rugby.
10 July – Netball: Australia win the 2011 Netball World Championships held in Singapore, defeating New Zealand 58–57 after extra time.
10 July – Soccer: The Matildas—the Australian women's football team—is knocked out of the 2011 FIFA Women's World Cup at the quarter-final stage, defeated by Sweden 3–1 in Augsburg.
24 July – Cycling: Cadel Evans wins the 2011 Tour de France. Evans is the first Australian to win the Tour de France.
30 July – Australian rules football:  hands  the second worst marginal defeat in AFL/VFL history, winning by 186 points. Twenty-four hours after the siren blew at Kardinia Park, Dean Bailey was sacked as Demons coach after three and a half seasons at the helm.
3 September – Athletics: Sally Pearson wins the Women's 100 metres hurdles at the 2011 World Championships in Athletics at Daegu, South Korea.
4 September – Rugby League: The Melbourne Storm win their first legitimate minor premiership following the final main round of the 2011 NRL season. The Gold Coast Titans finish in last position, claiming the wooden spoon.
12 September – Tennis: Samantha Stosur wins the 2011 US Open, her first Grand Slam singles title.
26 September – Australian rules football: Dane Swan (Collingwood) wins the 2011 Brownlow Medal.
1 October – Australian rules football: Geelong wins the 2011 AFL Grand Final, defeating Collingwood 18.11 (119) to 12.9 (81).
2 October – Rugby league: The Manly-Warringah Sea Eagles win the 2011 NRL Grand Final, defeating the New Zealand Warriors 24–10. It is the Sea Eagles' most recent premiership win.
9 October – Motor racing: Garth Tander and Nick Percat, driving for the Holden Racing Team, win the 2011 Bathurst 1000.
22 October – Horse racing: Pinker Pinker wins the Cox Plate at Moonee Valley.
1 November – Horse racing: Dunaden, ridden by Christophe Lemaire and trained by Mikel Delzangles, wins the 2011 Melbourne Cup. The French-trained horse won in a photo finish over Red Cadeaux—the narrowest victory in the history of the race.
12 November – Commonwealth Games: The Gold Coast is announced as the host of the 2018 Commonwealth Games.
12 November – Athletics: Sally Pearson was named as the woman IAAF World Athlete of the Year for 2011.

Deaths
1 January – Sonia Humphrey, 63, television presenter and journalist
2 January – Robert Trumble, 91, writer and musician
9 January – Ernest Henry Lee-Steere, 98, businessman
9 January – Makinti Napanangka, late 1980s, Australian Papunya Tula artist
13 January – Mick Cremin, 87, rugby union player
15 January – Harvey James, 58, guitarist with Sherbet
17 January – Steve Prestwich, 56, drummer with Cold Chisel
18 January – Duncan Hall, 85, rugby league footballer
24 January – Peter Gibb, 56, criminal, prison escapee
2 February – Darrel Baldock, 72, Australian rules footballer, politician
7 February – Frank Roberts, 65, boxer, first Indigenous Olympian
12 February – James Elliott, 82, actor (Number 96)
21 February – Dick Klugman, 87, politician
6 March – Patricia Brennan, 66, advocate for the ordination of women
9 March – Des Meagher, 67, Australian rules footballer
13 March – Owsley Stanley, 76, counter-cultural figure
19 March – Kym Bonython, 90, arts identity
20 March – Bob Christo, 72, Bollywood actor
28 March – Esben Storm, 60, actor, producer and director
31 March – Tony Barrell, 70, broadcaster
31 March – Alan Fitzgerald, 75, journalist and satirist
8 April – David S. Clarke, 69, businessman and winemaker
8 April – Donald Shanks, 70, bass-baritone opera singer
11 April – John D'Orazio, 55, politician
11 April – Peter Ruehl, 64, columnist
13 April – Alan Noonan, 63, Australian rules footballer
17 April – Eric Gross, 84, composer
17 April – Blair Milan, 29, actor and television presenter
23 April – Dutch Tilders, 69, musician
5 May – Claude Choules, 110, last surviving combat World War I veteran
6 May – Barry Connolly, 72, Australian rules footballer
8 May – Lionel Rose, 62, boxer
16 May – Bob Davis, 82, Australian rules footballer
20 May – Ivan Gibbs, 83, Queensland politician
21 May – Bill Hunter, 71, actor
22 May – Ralph Hunt, 83, politician
23 May – Sam Faust, 26, rugby league player
25 May  – Terry Jenner, 66, cricketer
29 May – Jon Blake, 52, actor
29 May – Bill Roycroft, 96, equestrian
1 June – Frank Ponta, 75, paralympian
17 June – David Brockhoff, 83, rugby union player and coach
17 June – Rex Mossop, 83, rugby league and rugby union player and television personality
19 June – Tom Hungerford, 96, author and playwright
23 June – Len King, 88, politician and judge
30 June – Tom Kruse, 96, Outback mailman and documentary subject
30 June – Sean Wight, 47, Australian rules footballer (Melbourne)
6 July – Carly Hibberd, 26, Australian road racing cyclist
12 July – Allan Jeans, 77, Australian rules footballer and coach
15 July – Googie Withers, 94, actress
17 July – David Ngoombujarra, 44, actor
21 July – Ashleigh Connor, 21, soccer player
24 July – Ron Davies, 85, Western Australian politician
26 July – Margaret Olley, 88, artist
31 July – Clyde Holding, 80, politician
5 August – Aziz Shavershian, 22, bodybuilder
7 August – Nancy Wake, 98, World War II resistance fighter (died in England)
11 August – Karen Overington, 59, politician
18 August – Paul Lockyer, 61, journalist
18 August – John Abley, 80, Australian rules footballer
18 August – Brian Harrison, 79, politician
19 August – Merv Brooks, 92, Australian rules footballer
25 August – Elliott Johnston, 93, judge
31 August – Denis Collins, 58, Australian rules footballer
7 September – Harold Mair, 92, politician
11 September – Andy Whitfield, 39, actor (Spartacus: Blood and Sand)
13 September – David Jull, 66, politician
16 September – Ted Mullighan, 72, South Australian Supreme Court judge
17 September – Colin Madigan, 90, architect
29 September – Miriam Schmierer, 112, Australia's oldest living person and last known surviving Australian born in the 19th Century
1 October – Ruby Langford Ginibi, 77, author and Aboriginal historian
7 October – Diane Cilento, 78, actor
12 October – Dick Thornett, 71, water polo, rugby league and rugby union player
15 October – Sir Donald Dunstan, 88, military officer, Governor of South Australia (1982–1991)
17 October – Elaine Nile, 75, politician
18 October – George Chaloupka, 79, Aboriginal rock art expert
19 October – Keith Williams, 82, tourism property developer
20 October – Hunter, 36, rapper
24 October – Robert Bropho, 81, Aboriginal rights activist
4 November – Sarah Watt, 53, film director
10 November – David Boyd, 87, artist
13 November – Peter Roebuck, 55, cricketer and journalist (died in South Africa)
25 November – John Blades, 51, experimental musician
25 November – Dane Searls, 23, BMX rider
1 December – Arthur Beetson, 66, Rugby League footballer, first Indigenous Australian to captain a national team in any sport
3 December – Sam Loxton, 90, cricketer, footballer and politician
4 December – RJ Rosales, 37, actor
8 December – Sir Zelman Cowen, 92, 19th Governor-General of Australia
11 December – Harold Hopkins, 67, actor
15 December – Jason Richards, 35, motor racing driver
18 December – Jeremy Doyle, 28, wheelchair basketballer
 22 December – Bruce Ruxton, 85, former President of the Victorian Returned and Services League.
 31 December – Murray Barnes, 57, soccer player (Sydney Hakoah), national captain (1980–1981).
 31 December – Rex Jackson, 83, politician and convicted criminal.

See also

 2011 in Australian literature
 2011 in Australian television
 List of Australian films of 2011

References

 
Years of the 21st century in Australia